The International F-18 Air Coach was a 1920s American biplane transport that was designed and manufactured by the International Aircraft Corporation in Long Beach, California. The company stopped manufacturing F-18's by 1928 and sold its rights to the aircraft in 1931.

Only six F-18's were ever built.  One these aircraft, Miss Hollydale, was entered to fly in the 1927 Dole Air Race between Northern California and Hawaii, but the pilot withdrew from the competition before it began.

The F-18 initially had a cabin for four passengers and an open cockpit with side-by-side seating for a pilot and a fifth passenger. Later versions had an enclosed cabin. It was furnished with seat covers made by Cincinnati Auto Specialty Company.

Operators

 Airads
 Burdette Airlines
 Coast Airlines

Specifications (F-18)

References

Notes

Bibliography

 The Illustrated Encyclopedia of Aircraft (Part Work 1982-1985), 1985, Orbis Publishing, Page 2213

1920s United States civil utility aircraft
Biplanes